This is a list of airports and airfields in Estonia.

Airports
Airport names shown in bold indicate the facility has scheduled passenger service on a commercial airline.

Abandoned aerodromes

See also
 Transport in Estonia
 List of airports by ICAO code: E#EE – Estonia
 Wikipedia: Airline destination lists: Europe#Estonia
 List of the busiest airports in the Baltic states

References

External links

 Airfield information, including abandoned fields from Estonian Private Pilots' Association (EPPA) (in Estonian)
 
  – includes IATA codes

 
Estonia
Airports
Airports
Estonia